Full Scale is an album by American hip hop duo Showbiz and A.G., first released in early 1998 through D.I.T.C. Records as a nine-track extended play. Recording sessions for the EP took place at D&D Studios and at Battery Studios in New York with production was handled entirely by Show & AG. The EP, composed of five songs together with the instrumentals, featured guest appearances from Big Pun, KRS-One, O.C. and the Ghetto Dwellas. A CD version titled Full Scale LP appeared around 2002 included the 5 songs found on the EP together with ten additional tracks which had originally been released on various 12" singles and projects in the late 1990s. Beside artists involved in the EP version, the LP features guest verses from Big L, Diamond D and Lord Finesse, as well as production from DJ Greyboy and Amed Harris.

Song "Drop It Heavy" later appeared on A.G.'s 1999 solo album The Dirty Version and D.I.T.C.'s 2000 self-titled album. Song "Dignified Soldiers" from the LP was remixed and retitled as "Stand Strong" for D.I.T.C.. Songs "Time to Get This Money" and "Q & A" were also included as the fifteenth track on D.I.T.C.'s European and Japanese versions, respectively.

Track listing

References

External links

1998 EPs
1998 albums
Showbiz and A.G. albums
Albums produced by Showbiz (producer)